Šveicarija Eldership (previously Dumsiai Eldership) is a Lithuanian eldership, located in a southern part of Jonava District Municipality. As of 2020, administrative centre and largest settlement within eldership was Šveicarija.

History 
On 29 of March 2012 the Council of Jonava District Municipality approved the name change of eldership from Dumsiai eldership to Šveicarija eldership.

Geography

 Forests: Dumsiai Forest, Gaižiūnai Forest
 Rivers: Varpė, Taurosta, Jasnogurka;
 Lakes: Bulotai Lake;
 Ponds: Šveicarija Pond;
 Quarries: Zatyškiai Quarry, Tekas Quarry;

Populated places 
Following settlements are located in the Šveicarija Eldership (as for 2011 census):

Villages: Albertava, Bagdonava, Bajoriškiai, Barborlaukis, Bartoniai, Bulotai, Dirvaliai, Dumsiai, Dumsiškiai, Gaižiūnai, Gulbiniškiai, Gumbiškiai, Kisieliškiai, Klimynė, Londonas, Lukošiškiai, Marinauka, Meškoniai, Naujatriobiai, Paryžius, Petrynė, Prapuolynė, Pušynėlis, Ratušėliai, Salupiai, Skarbinai, Spanėnai, Stašėnai, Stepanava, Šalūgiškiai, Šileikos, Šveicarija, Varpiai
 Railway settlements: Dumsiai GS, Gaižiūnai GS

Transport 
The A6 highway is the main road connecting settlements with Jonava.

Demography

References

Elderships in Jonava District Municipality